Aughaville railway station, also called Aghaville, served the townland of Aghaville in County Cork, Ireland.

The station opened in 1881. Passenger services were withdrawn in 1961 by CIÉ.

History
Opened by the Cork and Bandon (Bantry Extension) Railway, by the beginning of the 20th century the station was run by the Great Southern and Western Railway. It was absorbed into the Great Southern Railways in 1925.

The station was then nationalised, passing on to the Córas Iompair Éireann as a result of the Transport Act 1944 which took effect from 1 January 1945. It was closed by this management.

References

Further reading

Disused railway stations in County Cork
Railway stations opened in 1881
Railway stations closed in 1961
1881 establishments in Ireland
1961 disestablishments in Ireland
Railway stations in the Republic of Ireland opened in the 19th century